Lycée professionnel Pierre Mendès France is a vocational senior high school in Villiers-le-Bel, Val-d'Oise, France, in the Paris metropolitan area.

The school is in the north of the Carreaux neighbourhood.

References

External links
 Lycée Pierre Mendès France 

Lycées in Val-d'Oise